Moner Moto Bou ("A wife-like mind") is a 1969 East Pakistani film directed by Rahim Nawaz and starring Razzak and Suchonda as lead pair. It also stars Khan Ataur Rahman and Sultana Zaman. It is one of the six films where Razzak and Suchonda shared screen time.

Music
The film's music was composed and written by Khan Ataur Rahman and Bashir Ahmad's song "Amake Porate Jodi Eto Lage Bhalo" went on to become a cult hit.

"Amake Porate Jodi Eto Lage Bhalo" - Bashir Ahmad

References

External links

1969 films
Bengali-language Pakistani films
Films scored by Khan Ataur Rahman
1960s Bengali-language films